Nalini Singh (born September 01, 1945) is an Indian journalist.

She has been the anchor for several current affairs programs on Doordarshan, and is most known for her program, 'Aankhon Dekhi', on investigative journalism.

She had made another show - Hello Zindagi, for Doordarshan, broadcast in 1995.

Early life
She is daughter of consumer rights activist, H. D. Shourie, and the sister of Indian journalists, Deepak Shourie, and Arun Shourie, who has also been a Union minister.

Career
Singh is also the managing director, TV Live India Pvt Ltd, and Managing Editor of News Channel, Nepal-1.

Personal life
She is also the daughter-in-law of Sir Chandeshwar Prasad Narayan Singh, former Governor of Uttar Pradesh and first Indian Ambassador to Nepal.  Ratna Vira, her daughter, has written a novel named 'Daughter by Court Order' which occasioned some speculation whether it is autobiographical. Ratna gave an interview in which she described her relationship with her mother as difficult.

Selected bibliography

Books

References

Indian women television journalists
Indian television journalists
Indian women television presenters
Indian television presenters
1945 births
Living people
Indian investigative journalists
20th-century Indian journalists
20th-century Indian women writers
Doordarshan journalists
Managing editors